Grant Smillie (born 3 May 1977) is an Australian house music producer and DJ from Melbourne.

Biography
Smillie often plays sets in clubs around Australia.

Smillie and Ivan Gough make up the production outfit TV Rock and toured with the Future Music Festival in 2010.

References

External links 
 TV Rock Official Website

1977 births
APRA Award winners
Australian DJs
DJs from Melbourne
Australian electronic musicians
Club DJs
Living people
Australian house musicians
Electronic dance music DJs